The 1912 Indiana gubernatorial election was held on November 5, 1912. Democratic nominee Samuel M. Ralston defeated Progressive nominee Albert J. Beveridge and Republican nominee Winfield T. Durbin with 42.95% of the vote. The vote splitting between the Republican and Progressive nominees benefited Ralston the Democrat tremendously in this election.

General election

Candidates
Major party candidates
Samuel M. Ralston, Democratic, President of the Lebanon School Board
Winfield T. Durbin, Republican, former Governor (1901-1905)

Other candidates
Albert J. Beveridge, Progressive, former U.S Senator (1899-1911)
Stephen N. Reynolds, Socialist
William H. Hickman, Prohibition
James Matthews, Socialist Labor

Results

References

1912
Indiana
Gubernatorial